The Rahat al-sudur wa-ayat al-surur or Rahat al-sudur, is a history of the Great Seljuq Empire, its breakup into minor beys and the subsequent Khwarazmian occupation, written by the Persian historian Muhammad bin Ali Rawandi and finished around 1204/1205. Rawandi was encouraged and supported in his endeavour by Shihab al-Din al-Kashani. Written in Persian and originally dedicated to Süleymanshah II, Rawandi re-dedicated his work to the Sultan of Rum, Kaykhusraw I.

Content
The early history of the Seljuqs written in the Rahat al-sudur, relies heavily upon the Saljuq-nama. However, events after 1175 are directly witnessed by Rawandi since he was a member of Toghrul III's court, making the Rahat al-sudur an invaluable source for Toghrul's reign. According to the Rahat al-sudur, the Seljuqs held the Ghaznavids in contempt due to their slave origins.

Rawandi appears to have intended the Rahat al-sudur to be a historical work, yet the book contains chapters on backgammon, chess, calligraphy, horsemanship, hunting and feasting. The final two chapters encompass the sultanate of Toghrul III, the last Seljuq beys and the Khwarazmian invasion. Rawandi viewed the Sultanate of Rum as champions of the Sunni faith and deplored the Khwarazmians. The final section consists of Hanafi legal works and courtly accomplishments. A final chapter was to cover anecdotes and jest, was never written. The book, as a whole, is written in a moralizing nature.

The Rahat al-sudur was translated into Turkish during the reign of Ottoman Sultan Murad II.

Modern era
In 1921, the Rahat al-sudur was published by Muhammad Iqbal (died 1938). It was recognized by Iqbal, Edward G. Browne and Mirza Muhammad Qazwini as a source in other texts, namely Jami' al-tawarikh of Rashid al-Din Hamadani (died 1318), Rawdat al-safa of Mirkhvand (died 1498) and Tarikh-i guzida of Hamdallah Mustawfi (died after 1339/40).

See also
 Akhbar al-dawla al-saljuqiyya

References

Sources

Seljuk Empire
Anatolian beyliks
History books about the Middle East
1200s books
Iranian books